Portula is a comune (municipality) in the Province of Biella in the Italian region Piedmont, located about  northeast of Turin and about  northeast of Biella.

One of the most important monuments in its territory is the Novareia sanctuary.

Portula borders the following municipalities: Caprile, Coggiola, Pray, Trivero.

Population history

References